"Paranoid Android" is a 1997 song by Radiohead.

Paranoid Android may also refer to:
Marvin (character), also known as Marvin the Paranoid Android
Paranoid Android (Legends of Tomorrow), an episode of Legends of Tomorrow
Paranoid Android (software), custom Android firmware